Inverness is a city in the Highland Council area of Scotland. It now shares its name with a number of places around the world.

Inverness may also refer to:

Places

Australia
 Inverness, Queensland, a locality in the Shire of Livingstone

Canada
Inverness, Nova Scotia
Inverness, Quebec
Inverness County, Nova Scotia
Municipality of the County of Inverness, Nova Scotia
Inverness (electoral district), Nova Scotia
Inverness (provincial electoral district), Nova Scotia

Scotland
 County of Inverness, also known as Inverness-shire, now a registration county, but also a general purpose county until 1975
 Inverness District, Highland Region, a local government district 1975 to 1996
 Lieutenancy of Inverness
 Inverness-shire Constabulary (1840 to 1968)
 Inverness Constabulary (1968 to 1975)
 Inverness Burghs (UK Parliament constituency) (1708 to 1918)
 Inverness-shire (UK Parliament constituency) (1708 to 1918)
 Inverness (UK Parliament constituency) (1918 to 1983)

Sweden
Inverness, Sweden

United States
Inverness, Bullock County, Alabama
Inverness, Shelby County, Alabama
Inverness, California
Inverness, Colorado
Inverness, Florida
Inverness, Illinois
Inverness, Indiana
Inverness Township, Michigan
Inverness, Mississippi
Inverness, Montana
Inverness Club, a golf club and course in Toledo, Ohio
Inverness (Burkeville, Virginia), a historic house and national historic district

Other 
 "Inverness", the name of Macbeth's castle in the play Macbeth by William Shakespeare
 Inverness Caledonian Thistle, a football team based in the city of Inverness, Scotland
 Inverness cape, an article of clothing associated with the fictional character, Sherlock Holmes
 list of ships named Inverness